The Men's Downhill competition of the Albertville 1992 Olympics was held at Val d'Isère on Sunday, 9 February.

The defending world champion was Franz Heinzer of Switzerland, who was also the defending World Cup downhill champion and led the current season. Defending Olympic champion Pirmin Zurbriggen of Switzerland had retired from competition two years earlier; this was the fourth consecutive Olympics without the defending champion in the field.

The race was run on a new course on La Face de Bellevarde, designed by 1972 champion Bernhard Russi. Austria's Patrick Ortlieb, who had yet to win a World Cup event, won the gold medal; Franck Piccard of France was only 0.05 seconds back to take the silver, and the bronze medalist was Günther Mader of Austria.  Ortlieb was first racer on the course, and he became the fifth Austrian to win the event, in its twelfth edition.  Heinzer was sixth, more than a second back.

Results
The race was started at 12:15 local time, (UTC +1).

Source:

References

External links
FIS results

Men's downhill
Winter Olympics